HMS Rocksand was an infantry landing ship in service with the Royal Navy during the late stages of the Second World War. She was launched in 1943 as Cape Argos and renamed Empire Anvil before being taken into Royal Navy service. Postwar she reverted to Empire Anvil and then Cape Argos and back to Empire Anvil again. She spent ten years laid up before resuming service as Hai Ya and Fu Ming before being scrapped in 1974.

Career

Wartime
HMS Rocksand was built by Consolidated Steel Corporation, Wilmington, California as the Cape Argos, and transferred under the terms of lend lease shortly after being completed in late 1943 under the name Empire Anvil. She was taken over by the Ministry of War Transport in 1944 and operated by Furness, Withy & Co. At the Normandy Landings, she and a sister ship Empire Javelin, were carrying US troops for Omaha Beach. In November 1944 she was requisitioned by the Admiralty and commissioned as HMS Rocksand, under which name she served out the remainder of the war.

Post war
HMS Rocksand participated in the reoccupation of the Nicobar Islands in October 1945, after which she was returned to the Ministry of War Transport in 1946, which briefly returned her to Furness, Withy & Co under her original name of Empire Anvil. By June 1946 she had been returned to the US Navy. In May 1947, Empire Anvil transported 1,300 Ukrainian refugees from Venice, Italy to Liverpool, Lancashire. She was operated from 1947 by the United States Maritime Commission, under her original name of Cape Argos, until 1948. It was then arranged that she would be sold to China, and she was renamed Hai Ya in preparation. The arrangement was subsequently cancelled due to the Communist take over and also she was not paid for, and by 1950 she had been renamed Empire Anvil and was laid up in the James River, Virginia. She returned to service on 27 July 1960,  when the deal finally went ahead. She was renamed Hai Ya, and entered service with the China Merchants Steam Navigation Co., of Taiwan. She sailed with them until 1973, when she was sold to Yang Ming Marine Transport Corporation, and renamed Fu Ming. She had a brief career with them, being scrapped at Keelung in 1974.

Notes

References
 
 
 

 

Type C1-S ships
Ships built in Los Angeles
1943 ships
Empire ships
Troop ships of the Royal Navy
Ministry of War Transport ships
Steamships of the United Kingdom
Merchant ships of the Republic of China
Steamships of the Republic of China
Merchant ships of the United States
Steamships of the United States